Jukka Lanki (born 11 June 1971) is a Finnish ski-orienteering competitor who has represented Finland internationally from 1996. He has achieved silver medals at the world championships, both individually and in the relay. In the World Cup his best overall result is finishing second in 2001, as well as several victories in individual races.

World championships
Lanki received a silver medal in the long course at the 2000 World Ski Orienteering Championships in Krasnoyarsk, and a bronze medal in Levi in 2005.

He received silver or bronze medals with the Finnish relay team in 1998, 2000, 2002, 2004 and 2005, and finished 5th in the relay in 2007.

World Cup
Lanki finished overall 6th in the World Cup in Ski Orienteering in 1999, overall third in 2000, overall second in 2001, and overall 5th in 2003.

See also
 Finnish orienteers
 List of orienteers
 List of orienteering events

References

1971 births
Living people
Finnish orienteers
Male orienteers
Ski-orienteers